Route 516, also known as Cartwright Highway, is a  north–south highway in southeastern Labrador in the Canadian province of Newfoundland and Labrador. It connects the town of Cartwright, along with the community of Paradise River, with the Trans-Labrador Highway (Route 510) at Cartwright Junction. The highway passes through remote, wooded, and hilly terrain for its entire length. The road is unpaved.

Route description

Route 516 begins at an intersection with Trans-Labrador Highway (Route 510) at Cartwright Junction and heads northward through remote, hilly, and wooded terrain for the next several kilometres. It crosses the Paradise River before meeting a local road leading to the community of the same name. This aforementioned intersection is located at the site of the former Paradise River Airport. The highway then parallels the eastern shore of Sandwich Bay for several kilometres, where it passes by Cartwright Airport, before entering the Cartwright town limits. Route 516 comes to an end at an intersection between Point Road and Main Road in downtown Cartwright near the harbour.

History

Phase II of the Trans-Labrador Highway involved completion of highway north to Cartwright from Red Bay, and was opened in 2002. Although the entire route was initially designated as Route 510, upon completion of Phase III, the northern  from Cartwright Junction was designated as Route 516.

Major intersections

References

Labrador
516